Tangier Island Airport  is an airport located on Tangier Island in the lower Chesapeake Bay. It is located in the state of Virginia. The airport conducts an average of 83 movements a month.

History 
Tangier Island was purchased with two overcoats in 1666. In 1969 land was dedicated for a runway. A medical clinic on the island is named after Dr. David Nichols who flew in to perform medical care from 1979 to 2010.

References

External links 
YouTube video of landing at Tangier Airport

Aviation in Virginia
1969 establishments in Virginia
Airports established in 1969
Transportation in Accomack County, Virginia